The Campaign Against Censorship (CAC) is a non-party political pressure group that opposes censorship and promotes freedom of expression in the United Kingdom. The group is based in Fareham, England. It was formerly named the Defence of Literature and the Arts Society (DLAS). It was founded in 1968 with the publisher John Calder as a prime mover behind it as a direct result of the Last Exit to Brooklyn novel publication trial. In 1976 it sent a delegation to see the Home Secretary to argue that "films  are subject to unjust discrimination and should be placed on the same legal basis as books and plays as far as content is concerned", and that "the common law offences on indecency should come to an end".

In 1983, the group was relaunched as the Campaign Against Censorship.

Guiding principles 

The guiding principles of the Campaign are:
 The right to obtain and impart knowledge
 Freedom from censorship
 Freedom for creative artists to present their perceptions, interpretations and ideas
 Freedom from discrimination on the grounds of sex, sexual orientation, race, politics or religion.

Officers 

Officers of the CAC are Edward Goodman (Chair) a lawyer and former local councillor, Dr Nigel Meek (Publications and Website Officer) and Mary Hayward (Hon. Secretary/Treasurer).

Informal links 

Campaign Against Censorship have informal links with Liberty, Backlash and the Open Rights Group.  In recent years, the CAC has also made formal submissions to the Deputy Prime Minister's 2010 Law Review and the 2013 proposals on press regulation. In December 2014, CAC absorbed the remnant of the late David Webb's National Campaign for the Reform of the Obscene Publications Acts.

See also
National Campaign for the Reform of the Obscene Publications Acts

References

Bibliography

External links
Official website

Civil liberties advocacy groups
Censorship in the United Kingdom
Fareham
Freedom of expression organizations
Lobbying organisations in the United Kingdom
Organisations based in Hampshire
1968 establishments in the United Kingdom
Civil rights organisations in the United Kingdom